The men's 20 kilometres walk event at the 2011 All-Africa Games was held on 14 September.

Results

References
Results
Results

Walk